Bob Yerkes (born Brayton Walter Yerkes on February 11, 1932) is an American stuntman. Beginning a life of acrobatics in the circus at the age of 15, Yerkes went on to work as a stuntman in such films as Back to the Future, Return of the Jedi, and Hook. Yerkes currently hosts stunt training days, on an invitation-only basis at his home in Los Angeles.

Filmography

References

1932 births
Living people
American stunt performers
Place of birth missing (living people)
People from North Carolina